Khan Amir (also Romanized as Khān Amīr and Khān Mīr) is a village in Shirvan Rural District, in the Central District of Borujerd County, Lorestan Province, Iran. At the 2006 census, its population was 128, in 24 families.

References 

Towns and villages in Borujerd County